Jalen Jones (born 13 November 1998) is a footballer who plays as a defender for Cray Wanderers. Born in England, he is a Guyana international.

Career

Before the second half of 2018–19, he signed for English seventh tier side Worthing. In 2020, Jones signed for Skellefteå in the Swedish fourth tier. In 2021, he signed for English seventh tier club Carshalton Athletic. In 2022, he signed for Braintree Town in the English sixth tier.

He began the 2022-23 season at Cray Wanderers.

Career statistics

References

External links
 

1998 births
Association football defenders
Biggleswade Town F.C. players
Braintree Town F.C. players
Carshalton Athletic F.C. players
Cheshunt F.C. players
Cray Wanderers F.C. players
Eastbourne United A.F.C. players
Merstham F.C. players
Worthing F.C. players
English expatriate footballers
English expatriate sportspeople in Sweden
English footballers
English people of Guyanese descent
Expatriate footballers in Sweden
Guyana international footballers
Guyanese expatriate footballers
Guyanese expatriate sportspeople in Sweden
Guyanese footballers
Living people